Rear-Admiral Andrew (Andy) Smith is a former Royal Canadian Navy officer.  Smith was the former Chief of Military Personnel and Chief of Transformation, until retiring in 2013 to move to a senior role with Public Works and Government Services Canada.

Military career

Chief of Military Personnel

Chief of Transformation

Following his tenure as CMP, Smith was appointed Chief of Transformation.  In this role, he would be the senior military leader responsible for the Defence Renewal Plan.

Awards and decorations
Smith's personal awards and decorations include the following:
(Ribbons centre)

Post-military career
In June 2013, Smith announced he was retiring from the military and would be appointed as the Associate Assistant Deputy Minister (Real Property) at Public Works and Government Services Canada (PWGSC).

References

21st-century Canadian civil servants
Canadian admirals
Living people
Year of birth missing (living people)
Place of birth missing (living people)